1942 is a vertically scrolling shooter game made by Capcom that was released for arcades in 1984. Designed by Yoshiki Okamoto, it was the first game in the 194X series, and was followed by 1943: The Battle of Midway.

1942 is set in the Pacific Theater of World War II, and is loosely based on the Battle of Midway. Despite the game being created by Japanese developers, the goal is to reach Tokyo and destroy the Japanese air fleet; this was due to being the first Capcom game designed with Western markets in mind. It went on to be a commercial success in arcades, becoming Japan's fifth highest-grossing table arcade game of 1986 and one of top five highest-grossing arcade conversion kits that year in the United States. It was ported to the NES, selling over  copies worldwide, along with other home platforms.

Gameplay 

The player pilots a Lockheed P-38 Lightning dubbed the "Super Ace". The player has to shoot down enemy planes; to avoid enemy fire, the player can perform a roll or vertical loop. During the game, the player may collect a series of power-ups, one of them allowing the plane to be escorted by two other smaller fighters in a Tip Tow formation. Enemies included: Kawasaki Ki-61s, Mitsubishi A6M Zeros and Kawasaki Ki-48s. The boss plane is a Nakajima G10N.

The game has "a special roll button that allows players to avoid dangerous situations by temporarily looping out of" the playfield. In addition to the standard high score, it also has a separate percentage high score, recording the best ratio of enemy fighters to enemies shot down.

Development 
The game was designed by Yoshiki Okamoto. The game's main goal was to be easily accessible for players. This is why they decided to use a World War II theme. 1942 was also the first Capcom game designed with Western markets in mind. That was why they decided to have the player pilot an American P-38 fighter plane, to appeal to the American market. The game is loosely based on the Battle of Midway, which was a turning point in the Pacific War when the Americans began defeating the Japanese.

Ports
The game was released to the MSX, NEC PC-8801, FM-7, and Sharp X1. It was released to the Famicom in 1985 in Japan and North America in 1986. The Famicom version was developed by Micronics.

A Game Boy Color version was also released in North America in May 2000 and the PAL region in the year 2001.

The European games publisher Elite Systems later released versions for the Amstrad CPC, ZX Spectrum, and Commodore 64.

The music of the Commodore 64 version is based on the main verse of Ron Goodwin's 633 Squadron movie score, with arrangement by Mark Cooksey.

Reception

In Japan, Game Machine listed 1942 on their January 1, 1985 issue as being the fourth most-popular arcade game for the previous two weeks. It went on to be Japan's seventh highest-grossing table arcade game during the first half of 1986, and the overall fifth highest-grossing table arcade game of 1986. In the United States, it was one of the top five highest-grossing arcade conversion kits of 1986. In the United Kingdom, it was the top-grossing arcade game on the Euromax arcade charts for five months in 1987, from July through November.

The NES version sold over  copies worldwide. 1942 was Capcom's breakaway hit, eclipsing in popularity the company's preceding three titles: Vulgus, Sonson, and Pirate Ship Higemaru.

Mike Roberts reviewed the arcade game in the May 1985 issue of British magazine Computer Gamer. While noting the game's scenario was "an odd subject for a Japanese arcade manufacturer" to take up, he said it has "very nice graphics" especially the "graphically excellent loops" and had an "original" gameplay feature in the form of the percentage high score. Retrospectively, Brett Alan Weiss of AllGame called it "a fondly remembered" shooter and praising the special roll button, "perfectly balanced gameplay, colorfully detailed graphics," and "nifty" power-ups, making "the game a true classic."

Legacy
1942 was the first Capcom title to spawn a successful series of sequels, with five titles in the 194X line released from 1987 to 2000. Many of Capcom's other vertical shooters featured very similar gameplay, such as Varth: Operation Thunderstorm.

It was re-released in Capcom Generations 1 for the PlayStation and Saturn consoles. It was featured in the Capcom Classics Collection for the PlayStation 2 and Xbox, as well as Capcom Classics Collection: Reloaded for the PlayStation Portable. The arcade version was added to the Wii Virtual Console in Japan on December 21, 2010, the PAL and North American regions in January 2011. It was also re-released for Windows Mobile Professional.

1942: Joint Strike was released for Xbox Live Arcade and PlayStation Network in 2008. 1942: First Strike was released for iOS in 2010.

The game series has sold a total of 1.4 million units worldwide as of December 31, 2019, and stands as Capcom's 18th best-selling franchise.

References

External links

1984 video games
Arcade video games
Amstrad CPC games
Capcom games
Commodore 64 games
IOS games
FM-7 games
Game Boy Color games
MSX2 games
NEC PC-8801 games
Nintendo Entertainment System games
PlayChoice-10 games
Romstar games
Sega Saturn games
Sharp X1 games
ZX Spectrum games
Vertically scrolling shooters
PlayStation Network games
Virtual Console games
Pacific War video games
Windows Mobile Professional games
Xbox 360 Live Arcade games
Video games developed in Japan
Video games scored by Mark Cooksey
Video games set in 1942
Video games set in Alaska
Video games set in Japan
Video games set in the Marshall Islands
Video games set in the Northern Mariana Islands
Video games set in Okinawa Prefecture
Video games set in Papua New Guinea
Video games set in the Philippines
Video games set in the United States
Vertically-oriented video games
Aircraft carriers in fiction
Digital Eclipse games
Multiplayer and single-player video games
Cooperative video games